A top is a spinning toy.

Top also may refer to:

Geography
 Top, any subsidiary summit of a munro
 Proper names of geographical features:
 Top River, tributary of the Olt, in Romania
 In Azerbaijan:
Top, Oghuz, 
 Top, Zangilan

People
 Top (surname)
 Noordin Mohammad Top (1968–2009), a Malaysian/Indonesian Muslim extremist
  U.S. military jargon for specific non-commissioned-officer ranks:
 Army First Sergeant
 Marine Corps Master Sergeant
  Jargon for roles in human-sexuality:
 Top, or dominant, role in BDSM practices
 One in a triad of sexual postural preferences, specifically Top, bottom and versatile
 A slang term for the act of Fellatio

Arts, entertainment, and media
 Top (comics), a supervillain character from the DC Comics universe
 The Top (album), a 1984 album by The Cure
 "The Top" (short story), a short story by Franz Kafka
 Top TV Papua, regional television station in Papua, Indonesia
 Top (album), a 2020 album by Youngboy Never Broke Again
Top (song), a song by Stray Kids
 "Top", a song by Live, from the album Throwing Copper
 "Top", a song by Fredo Bang

Brands and enterprises 
 Top (rolling papers), brand for hand-rolled cigarettes
 Top Air, Indonesian airline company
 Top Oil, Irish oil company

Computing
 Top (software), a standard Unix program
 .top domain, a gTLD (generic top level domain) existing since 2014
 Top type, in computer science type theory, the data type containing all others
 Top of stack, the first element of a Stack (abstract data type)

Mathematics
 Top (category theory), written Top, a category of topological spaces or topological manifolds
 Top (algebra), in module theory, the largest semisimple quotient of a module
 Top, written ⊤ or 1, in lattice theory, the greatest element in a partially ordered set
 Top (mathematical logic), written top or ⊤, a data type containing all others
    
 Top, down tack, or Tee (symbol), the symbol ⊤

Physics
 Top quark, the third-generation up-type quark

Textiles
 Top (clothing), clothing designed to be worn over the torso
 Top (sailing ship), part of a ship's rigging
 Top (tool), tool for  rope manufacture

See also
 TOP (disambiguation)
 Topping (disambiguation)